Alina Aliaksandraŭna Harnasko (born 9 August 2001) is a Belarusian individual rhythmic gymnast and former junior rhythmic gymnastics group gymnast. She is the 2020 Olympic all-around bronze medalist, 2021 World Championships all-around silver medalist and ribbon gold medalist, 2020 European all-around silver medalist, and twice Grand Prix final all-around silver medalist (2018 & 2020).

Junior

2015 
Harnasko has won numerous medals in the Junior World Cup and Junior Grand Prix series. She briefly competed as a member of the Belarusian Group that competed at the 2015 European Junior Championships where Belarus won Group silver in the All-around and gold in 5 Balls. Right after, she started competing as individual again. On October 16-18 she competed at International Tournament Tart Cup, where she took bronze medal in Junior All-around (59.500), behind Anna Sokolova and Maria Sergeeva. This was her first individual competition that year.

2016 
In 2016, she started the competition season in Hungary at International Tournament Gracia Fair Cup, where she won gold All-around medal in junior category. At the International Tournament Alina Cup in Moscow, she won gold in clubs and rope, bronze in hoop and silver in Team competition. She also competed at International Tournament Baltic Hoop in Riga, Latvia, winning silver medal in Junior All-around. At the 2016 European Junior Championships in Holon, Harnasko won 2 silver medals in team (together with Yulia Isachanka, Julia Evchik) and individual hoop final (tied with Israel's Nicol Zelikman). On September 9–11, Harnasko together with senior teammates Katsiaryna Halkina and Hanna Bazhko represented team Dinamo at the annual 2016 Aeon Cup in Tokyo, where they won the team silver and with Harnasko taking silver in the junior all-around.

Senior

2017 
In 2017 season, Harnasko made her senior international debut competing at the L.A. Lights. She then competed at the Senior International tournament in Moscow, the Alina Cup where she finished 4th in the all-around behind Israel's Nicol Zelikman. At the 2017 Grand Prix Kyiv she finished 10th in the all-around. She finished 5th in the all-around at the 2017 Grand Prix Thiais, she qualified to 3 apparatus finals and won a bronze in clubs. From March 31 – April 2, Harnasko competed at the Grand Prix Marbella finishing 9th in the all-around and qualified 2 event finals, where she won bronze in ribbon. She competed in her first World Cup meet at the Pesaro World Cup where she finished 8th in the all-around behind Israel's Victoria Veinberg Filanovsky, she qualified to 2 apparatus finals finishing 5th in clubs and 7th in hoop. At the 2017 Baku World Cup, she finished 4th in the all-around finals, behind Bulgaria's Neviana Vladinova, and also won a bronze in the ribbon and hoop in the apparatus finals. On May 5–7, Harnasko competed at the 2017 Sofia World Cup again finishing 4th in the all-around, she qualified in 3 apparatus finals and won gold in clubs ahead of hometown girl Neviana Vladinova, bronze in ball and placed 7th in ribbon. On May 19–21, Harnasko along with teammate Katsiaryna Halkina represented the individual seniors for Belarus at the 2017 European Championships, she qualified in all apparatus finals taking bronze in ball, finished 4th in clubs, 5th in ribbon and 7th in hoop. Harnasko's next event was at the 2017 World Challenge Cup Guadalajara where she won bronze in the all-around behind Ekaterina Selezneva, she qualified in 3 apparatus finals: taking silver in hoop, bronze in ball and placed 7th in clubs. On July 7–9, Harnasko finished 16th in the all-around at the 2017 Berlin World Challenge Cup, she qualified in ribbon final. Harnasko competed at the quadrennial held 2017 World Games in Wrocław, Poland from July 20–30, she qualified in 2 apparatus finals finishing 4th in hoop and ball. On August 4–6, Harnasko competed at the 2017 Minsk World Challenge Cup winning silver in the all-around behind Aleksandra Soldatova, she qualified in all 4 apparatus finals taking 2 silver medals in ball and ribbon, a bronze in clubs and finished 7th in hoop. On August 11–13, Harnasko competed at the 2017 Kazan World Challenge Cup finishing 9th in the all-around, she qualified in the hoop final and finished in 5th. On August 30 - September 3, Harnasko and Katsiaryna Halkina represented in the individual competitions for Belarus at the 2017 World Championships in Pesaro, Italy; she qualified in the clubs final and finished in 7th place. Harnasko finished 13th in the all-around final behind Japan's Sumire Kita On September 29-October 1, Harnasko was scheduled to compete at the annual World Club Cup the "Aeon Cup" in Tokyo, Japan; however she withdrew before the start of competition because of injury. She underwent a knee surgery on November 8 in Berlin, Germany.

2018 
Harnasko started the season at Baltic Hoop in Riga, Latvia where she took 9th place in All-around and silver medal in Ball final. She then took silver medal in All-around at the International Tournament Deriguina Cup in Kyiv and then sat out from competitions for the rest of the season recovering from an ankle surgery, which she had in April. She also suffered a back injury, which meant she could not compete for most of the year. She competed at Grand Prix Marbella, Spain from October 26–28, where she finished 2nd in All-around behind Ukraine's Vlada Nikolchenko. She qualified to all apparatus finals and placed 5th with hoop, 3rd in ball, 7th in clubs and ribbon.

2019 
In 2019, Harnasko started the season at L.A. Lights, where she won gold in all-around and clubs, placed 3rd with hoop and ball and 5th with ribbon. She scored 22,200 points with clubs, which is her personal best. Then she competed at Grand Prix Kyiv, in Ukraine, where she finished 9th in the all-around. She qualified to ball and clubs finals and placed 4th in both. Harnasko's next competition was an international tournament in Corbeil-Essonnes, France, where she won the all-around competition and qualified to all finals. She won three more medals there, bronze with hoop, silver with clubs and gold with ribbon. In April, she competed at World Cup Pesaro and took 12th place in All-around. Next day, she won bronze medals in both Clubs and Ribbon finals. She also qualified to two Apparatus finals at World Cup Sofia, where she took 7th place in All-around. On May 16-19, Harnasko along with teammates Katsiaryna Halkina and Anastasiia Salos represented the individual seniors for Belarus at the 2019 European Championships in Baku, Azerbaijan they won silver medal in Team competition together with Belarusian junior group. Alina then also qualified to Ball final, where she ended on 8th place (18.800). Her next competition was Grand Prix Holon in Israel, where she finished on 4th place in All-around. On August 30–September 1 she competed at World Challenge Cup Kazan, in Russia, and placed 14th in All-around, qualifying to Hoop and Clubs finals, where she won bronze medals. On September 6–8, she took bronze medal in All-around at World Challenge Cup in Portimão, Portugal. She took another bronze medal in Hoop final behind Alexandra Agiurgiuculese and teammate Anastasiia Salos the next day. On September 16–22, Harnasko,  Katsiaryna Halkina and Anastasiia Salos represented Belarus in the individual competitions at the 2019 World Championships in Baku, Azerbaijan and won bronze medal in Team competition; she qualified in the clubs and ribbon finals and finished in 6th place. She ended on 16th place in the all-around Qualifications and did not advance into finals due to 2 gymnasts per country rule. In October, she competed at the annual World Club Cup the "Aeon Cup" in Tokyo, Japan, representing Dinamo with Katsiaryna Halkina and junior Darya Tkatcheva. They took bronze medal in Team competition, behind Russia and Ukraine. She also won silver medal in All-around at Belarusian Championships that year.

2020 
She competed at Grand Prix Brno and won gold medal in All-around in front of Ukrainian  Khrystyna Pohranychna and Bulgarian Boryana Kaleyn with the score of 89,950. She qualified to all four finals, winning gold medal in Hoop final (23,700) and bronze medal in Ribbon final (20,250). She competed at International Tournament of Marina Lobatch and won gold medal in All-around (105.850) in front of teammate Anastasiia Salos. She won two more golds in Ball and Clubs final and two silver medals in Hoop and Ribbon final. In November, she competed at the 2020 European Championships in Kyiv, Ukraine and won silver medal in All-around, tied with Linoy Ashram (100,900) who took gold.

2021: Olympic year 

Harnasko competed at the Sofia World Cup, finishing 3rd in All-around finals behind Boryana Kaleyn, and in the event finals she finished 4th in Hoop, 2nd in Ball, 7th in Clubs and 5th in Ribbon. 

At the Tashkent World Cup, in April, where she finished 5th behind Sofía Raffaeli in the All -Around finals, and in the event finals she finished 1st Ribbon, 3rd in Clubs and Ball. 

At the Baku World Cup, she finished sixth in the All-Around finals behind Linoy Ashram. In the event finals she finished 2nd in Ribbon, 3rd in Hoop, 6th in Ball. 

At the Pesaro World Cup, she finished 3rd in the All-around finals behind Arina Averina, and in the event finals, she finished 5th in Hoop, 6th in Ball, 4th in Clubs and 3rd in ribbon. 

In June, she competed at the European Rhythmic Gymnastics Championships, in Varna, Bulgaria, finishing 6th in the All-around final, behind compatriot, Anastasiia Salos. In the event finals, she placed 4th in Hoop, 3rd in Ball, 6th in clubs and 2nd in Ribbon. In team finals, the Belarus team finished 2nd with Anastasiia Salos and the Belarusian group. 

At the Minsk World Cup Challenge, she finished 1st in All-around finals ahead of Lala Kramarenko and Anastasiia Salos respectively. She also finished 1st in Hoop, Ball and Club finals.

At the Tel Aviv Grand Prix, she finished 2nd behind Linoy Ashram and ahead of Anastasiia Salos. In the event finals she finished 3rd in Hoop and 2nd in Ball, Clubs, and Ribbon. 

In August, Harnasko competed at the Tokyo 2020 Olympics. On August 6, she qualified for the top 10 individual All-around finals after finishing fourth behind Linoy Ashram. On August 7, Harnasko finished 3rd in the All-Around finals behind Linoy Ashram and Dina Averina respectively, after Arina Averina had errors and inaccuracies with her Ribbon routine, she stayed in fourth place, giving Harnasko the opportunity to fight for the Olympic bronze.  Harnasko became the fifth Belarusian rhythmic gymnast to medal at an Olympic Game, after Marina Lobatch (Seoul 1988), Yulia Raskina (Sydney 2000), Inna Zhukova (Beijing 2008) and Liubov Charkashyna (London 2012, being the last).  

Harnasko withdrew from the Marbella Grand Prix that took place in October, later confirming that the reason she did not compete was that she was tested positive for COVID-19. Her compatriot Anastasiia Salos also withdrew her registration the day before due to an injury.  

At the 2021 Rhythmic Gymnastics World Championships, Harnasko qualified to the All-around and event finals. She finished 2nd in Hoop, 3rd in Ball, 5th in Clubs and 1st in the Ribbon final, became the first non-Russian gymnast to win a gold medal in an event final at the World Championships, since Ukraine's Ganna Rizatdinova in 2013 with the Hoop. She is also the first Belarusian gymnast to win a  gold medal in an event final since Larissa Lukyanenko in 1996 with the Rope. She finished 2nd in the Individual All-around finals and together with teammate(s) Anastasiia Salos and the Belarusian Senior group, they finished 3rd in the team event.

2022 
In 2022, Alina started the season at Grand Prix Tartu, in Estonia. She won gold medal in All-around, Hoop, Ball and Ribbon, and silver in Clubs final. 

On 7 March, FIG eliminated all Russian and Belarusian athletes from competing until further notice.

Routine music information

Detailed Olympic results

Competitive highlights
(Team competitions in seniors are held only at the World Championships, Europeans and other Continental Games.)

References

External links
 
 
 https://e-champs.com/profile/162

2001 births
Living people
Belarusian rhythmic gymnasts
Gymnasts from Minsk
Medalists at the Rhythmic Gymnastics World Championships
Medalists at the Rhythmic Gymnastics European Championships
Gymnasts at the 2020 Summer Olympics
Olympic gymnasts of Belarus
Olympic bronze medalists for Belarus
Medalists at the 2020 Summer Olympics
Olympic medalists in gymnastics